The Empire Maple class tug was a class of tug built for the Royal Navy and Royal Australian Navy during World War II.

Royal Navy

 Empire Folk
  Empire Percy
 Empire Plane
 Empire Seraph

Royal Australian Navy

DST 931 Emu
DST 932 Bronzewing
DST 933 Mollymawk

References

Tugboats of the Royal Australian Navy
Tugboats of the Royal Navy